Long Rapung is a former settlement in the Marudi division of Sarawak, Malaysia. Long Rapung lies in the Dapur River floodplain. It was formerly a village but was evacuated during the Confrontation. Now the shelters provide overnight accommodation hunters and for visitors walking to Ba Kelalan or climbing Gunung Murud.

Neighbouring settlements include:

References

Villages in Sarawak